Hostouň is a town in Domažlice District in the Plzeň Region of the Czech Republic. It has about 1,200 inhabitants.

Administrative parts
Villages of Babice, Holubeč, Horoušany, Mělnice, Mírkovice, Přes, Skařez, Slatina, Štítary, Svržno and Sychrov are administrative parts of Hostouň.

Geography
It les in the Upper Palatinate Forest Foothills, on the upper Radbuza River.

History
The first written mention of Hostouň is from 1238, as a property of Gumpert of Hostouň. His descendants who ruled the area until the 15th century also possessed the Palatinate town of Schönsee.

During the Hussite Wars, Ctibor of Wolfstein, a supporter of Imperator Sigismund, ruled Hostouň. When the reign of the noble families of Wolfstein and Rabenstein came to an end, the Hostouň estate was taken over by the Lords of Guttenstein. In 1587 the Emperor Rudolf II awarded Hostouň the rank of a town and a coat of arms. Additionally in 1587 the town was granted a concession to hold two other fairs and a horse market in addition to the annual market.

At the end of the 16th century, the Czech population predominated, but ethnic Germans began to arrive. As a consequence of the Battle of White Mountain, the property of the Guttensteins was confiscated. The estate was sold to Zdeněk of Mitrovice (1622), after a short period sold to the family of Czernin and in 1656 to the Counts of Trauttmansdorff-Weinsberg, who combined their estates of Horšovský Týn and Hostouň.

In 1914, an imperial military horse breeding operation of Galicia and Bukowina was transferred to Hostouň. During World War II parts of the famous Lipizzaner horses of the Spanish Riding School in Vienna were located in Hostouň. In 1952, the stud farm was abolished.

From 1938 to 1945, Hostouň was annexed by Nazi Germany and administered as part of Reichsgau Sudetenland. In 1946 the Germans were the major ethnic group in Hostouň. After the World War II, the German population was expelled and many buildings were demolished. Additionally, Hostouň lost the rank of a town, which was restored in 2006.

Demographics

Transport
Hostouň lies on the railway line of local importance from Domažlice to Bělá nad Radbuzou.

Sights

The landmark of Hostouň is the parish Church of Saint James the Great. It was first mentioned in written records in 1360. The church was rebuilt in the Baroque style in 1731 and reconstructed after the great fire in 1877. It includes a copy of a wood carved Madonna, which was adored as the "Shrine of the Sorrowful Mother of God of Hostouň". The Baroque rectory dates from the 18th century.

The Chapel of the Assumption of the Virgin Mary was built in 1663 as a chapel for the cemetery by a donation from Susanna Kleinschmidt.

The Hostouň Castle was originally a fortress, first mentioned in 1508. In the first half of the 17th century, it was already described as an aristocratic residence. The originally four-winged castle was reduced to today's two wings due to construction modifications. Insensitive building modifications in the 20th century erased the historical character. Since 2002, the castle has been used as a juvenile jail.

Twin towns – sister cities

Hostouň is twinned with:
 Waldthurn, Germany

References

External links

Multilingual website about Hostouň's history

Cities and towns in the Czech Republic
Populated places in Domažlice District